David Chelule (born 7 July 1977) is a Kenyan long-distance runner who specializes in the half marathon, having run the 5000 and 10,000 metres earlier in his career.

His cousin Julius also participated at the World Junior Championships in Sydney, and won a gold medal in the 3000 metres steeplechase.

Achievements

Personal bests
3000 metres - 7:37.36 min (1999)
5000 metres - 12:57.79 min (1999)
10,000 metres - 27:32.18 min (1996) 
Half marathon - 1:02:08 hrs (2000)

External links

sports-reference

1977 births
Living people
Kenyan male long-distance runners
Kenyan male steeplechase runners
Athletes (track and field) at the 2000 Summer Olympics
Olympic athletes of Kenya
African Games silver medalists for Kenya
African Games medalists in athletics (track and field)
Kenyan male cross country runners
Athletes (track and field) at the 1999 All-Africa Games